This article is about the demographic features of the population of Artsakh, including population density, ethnicity, education level, health of the populace, economic status, religious affiliations, and other aspects of the population.

In the census of 2015, the population of Artsakh had a population of 145,053, consisting of 144,683 Armenians and 238 Russians, and others.

Most of the Armenian population is Christian and belongs to the Armenian Apostolic Church. Certain Orthodox Christian and Evangelical Christian denominations also exist; other religions include Judaism.

Historical overview of Artsakh's demographics

18th century
Concrete numbers about the demographic situation in Artsakh appear since the 18th century. Archimandrite Minas Tigranian, after completing his secret mission to Persian Armenia ordered by the Russian Tsar Peter the Great stated in a report dated March 14, 1717, that the patriarch of the Gandzasar Monastery, in Artsakh, had under his authority 900 Armenian villages.

In his letter of 1769 to Russia's Count P. Panin, the Georgian king Erekle II, in his description of Artsakh, suggests:

When discussing Karabakh and Shushi in the 18th century, the Russian diplomat and historian S. M. Bronevskiy indicated in his Historical Notes that Karabakh, which he said "is located in Greater Armenia", had as many as 30,000–40,000 armed Armenian men in 1796.

Ottoman land surveys in 1593 and 1727 recorded several Turkic/Azerbaijani nomadic tribes in the historical Highland Karabakh (Khachen, Dizak, Varanda, Gülüstan) and dozens in Lowland Karabakh. Russian ethnologist Anatoly N. Yamskov points out that the latter tribes practiced summer migrations from the pastures of the Karabakh lowlands to the pastures of the mountainous part of Karabakh and stayed there during the summer season. This tradition lasted from the very beginning of penetration of nomadic herdsmen in the region till the beginning of the 20th century. Additionally, several sedentary Muslim villages were listed in the 1727 Ottoman census in the historical Nagorno-Karabakh, such as Qarğabazar in Dizak (currently in Fuzuli District).

19th-early 20th centuries
A survey prepared by the Russian imperial authorities in 1823, several years before the 1828 Armenian migration from Persia to the newly established Armenian Province, shows that all Armenians of Karabakh compactly resided in its highland portion, i.e. on the territory of the five traditional Armenian principalities in Artsakh, and constituted an absolute demographic majority on those lands (NKAO). The survey's more than 260 pages recorded not the exact population, but the number of villages, as such:

However, Russian and subsequently Soviet censuses and surveys were conducted during the winter and thus considered only the sedentary, predominantly Armenian population, and not the Azeri nomadic population, which stayed in the lowlands during the cold months of year. According to A. N. Yamskov, during the summer months, the demographics of the mountainous part of Karabakh changed drastically, as in the late 1890s, almost 97% of the tens of thousands of Azeris in the lowlands moved to one of the several mountainous pastures, predominantly in Nagorno-Karabakh.

In 1918, the population of Mountainous Karabakh consisted of 165 thousand Armenians (71.4%), 59 thousand Muslims (25.5%), of whom 20 thousand resided in the city of Shushi, main city of Karabakh, and 7 thousand Russians (3.1%). Nagorno-Karabakh Autonomous Oblast, which was established in 1923, did not correspond to the borders of Mountainous Karabakh, as one of its historical districts Gulistan was excluded, and in the rest only Armenian-dominated parts were included, thus leaving as many as possible Azeri villages of Mountainous Karabakh out of autonomous oblast.

According to 1926 All-Union census of Soviet Union, 125,159 people inhabited NKAO, of whom 111,694 (89,2%) were Armenians and 12,592 (10%) were Azeris, indicated as Turks.

Soviet era and aftermath of Karabakh War
During the Soviet times, the leaders of the Azerbaijan SSR tried to change the demographic balance of the Nagorno Karabakh Autonomous Region by increasing the number of Azeri residents through opening a university with Azeri, Russian and Armenian sectors and a shoe factory, sending Azerbaijanis from other parts of Azerbaijan SSR to the NKAO. Heydar Aliyev said in an interview in 2002, "By doing this, I tried to increase the number of Azeris and to reduce the number of Armenians." However, A. N. Yamskov argues that these were Azeris familiar with Nagorno-Karabakh, including the descendants of Azeri nomads that were forced to stop nomadic migrations in 1930s.

Expulsion of Non-Armenian population

Nearing the collapse of the Soviet Union in 1989, the Nagorno-Karabakh Autonomous Oblast boasted a population of 145,593 Armenians (76.4%), 42,871 Azeris (22.4%), and several thousand Kurds, Russians, Greeks, and Assyrians. The entire Azeri and Kurdish population were expelled from the region following the heaviest years of fighting in the First Nagorno-Karabakh War, from 1992 to 1993.

The Nagorno-Karabakh conflict has resulted in the displacement of 597,000 Azerbaijanis (this figure includes 230,000 children born to internally displaced persons (IDPs) and 220,000 Azeris, 18,000 Kurds and 3,500 Russians who fled from Armenia to Azerbaijan from 1988 to 1989). The vast majority were expelled from the occupied territories surrounding Nagorno-Karabakh rather than the enclave itself.

Conversely, 280,000 persons — virtually all ethnic Armenians who fled Azerbaijan during the 1988–1993 war were living in refugee-like circumstances in Armenia.

Languages

The main language spoken in Artsakh is Armenian; however, Karabakh Armenians speak a dialect of Armenian which is considerably different from that which is spoken in Armenia as it is layered with Russian, Turkish and Persian words. Most of the older generation also speaks Azerbaijani.

2000s
Until 2000, the country's net migration was at a negative.

In 2001, the Artsakh's reported population was 95% Armenian, with the remaining total including Assyrians, Greeks, and Kurds.

For the first half of 2007, 1,010 births and 659 deaths were reported, with a net emigration of 27.

In March 2007, the local government announced that its population had grown to 138,000. The annual birth rate was recorded at 2,200–2,300 per year, an increase from nearly 1,500 in 1999.

In 2011, officials from YAP submitted a letter to OSCE which stated, "The OSCE fact-finding mission report released last year also found that some 15,000 Armenians have been illegally settled on Azerbaijan's occupied territories."

However, the OSCE report, released in March 2011, estimates the population of territories controlled by ethnic Armenians "adjacent to the breakaway Azerbaijani region of Nagorno-Karabakh [Artsakh]" to be 14,000, and states "there has been no significant growth in the population since 2005."

Most of the Armenian population is Christian and belongs to the Armenian Apostolic Church. Certain Orthodox Christian and Evangelical Christian denominations also exist; other religions include Judaism.

With the turmoil caused by the Syrian Civil War, several hundred Syrian-Armenian citizens have moved from Syria to the Republic of Artsakh. Many of these refugees are being offered assistance by the government in the form of land, housing, extra educational assistance, and other such basics that will help them quickly assimilate and start their new lives.

Overall dynamic of ethnic groups in the 20th and 21st centuries

5 districts of Azerbaijan (Kalbajar, Lachin, Gubadly, Zangilan, Jabrail) are fully occupied by the Republic of Artsakh. Artsakh also occupied 2 other districts (Fuzuli and Aghdam) partially. The population of the total 7 districts of Azerbaijan not belonging to the Nagorno-Karabach AO but for the most part under occupation of the Republic of Artsakh, was 393,569 in 1979, only a small Armenian minority (3,661 or only 0,93%). Also 11,000 Kurds have been deported since 1988 by separatist Armenian forces.

Population of the Republic of Artsakh
From the National Statistical Service of Republic of Artsakh:

Population by age group

Population by entity on the Map of Provinces

Urban population by region

Rural population by region

Vital statistics

Registered births and deaths
From the National Statistical Service of Republic of Artsakh:

Current vital statistics

Vital statistics for urban population

Vital statistics for rural population

See also 

 Demographics of Armenia
 Demographics of Azerbaijan
 List of cities and towns in Artsakh
 Peoples of the Caucasus

Notes

References 

 
Republic of Artsakh